Nahi or NAHI may refer to:

 Nath Í (disambiguation), an Irish personal name given to two early Irish saints and a legendary king of Connacht
 Non accidental head injury, a constellation of medical findings

See also
 Nakhi, an ethnic group inhabiting the foothills of the Himalayas, China
 Nahiyah or nahia, a regional or local type of administrative division